Boulevard Richard-Lenoir, running from the Bastille to the Avenue de la République, is one of the wide tree-lined boulevards driven through Paris by Baron Haussmann during the Second French Empire of Napoleon III.

The Boulevard is named after François Richard and Joseph Lenoir-Dufresne, industrialists who brought the cotton industry to Paris in the 18th and 19th century. It is the site of a weekly art market and of a bi-weekly fruit and vegetable market that is one of the largest in Paris.

Fictional
Georges Simenon's famous detective Jules Maigret is portrayed as living at 132 Boulevard Richard-Lenoir.

See also
Richard-Lenoir (Paris Métro)

References

Richard-Lenoir
11th arrondissement of Paris